Owrganjeh (also Romanized as Ūrganjeh) is a village in Bizineh Rud Rural District, Bizineh Rud District, Khodabandeh County, Zanjan Province, Iran. At the 2006 census, its population was 142, in 31 families.

References 

Populated places in Khodabandeh County